EyePoint Pharmaceuticals, Inc. (formerly pSivida Corp.) pSivida is a Watertown, Massachusetts company specialising in the application of microelectromechanical systems (MEMS) and nanotechnology to drug delivery.

pSivida obtained porous silicon technology from the British government Defence Evaluation and Research Agency (DERA, now QinetiQ). QinetiQ continues to be a strategic partner.

In June 2004, pSivida acquired full ownership of pSiMedica. In April 2018, pSivida purchased eye products firm Icon Bioscience.

See also
 Alimera Sciences, pSvida's partner on Iluvien

References

External links
 
 
 
 pSivida Mesoporous silicon patent

Qinetiq
Nanotechnology companies
Companies based in Middlesex County, Massachusetts
Drug delivery devices
Pharmaceutical companies of the United States
Health care companies based in Massachusetts